Emerald Isle is one of the uninhabited members of the Canadian arctic islands, specifically of the Parry Islands subgroup of the Queen Elizabeth Islands. It belongs to the Northwest Territories, Canada.

References

External links
 Emerald Isle in the Atlas of Canada - Toporama; Natural Resources Canada

Islands of the Queen Elizabeth Islands
Uninhabited islands of the Northwest Territories